WCHN (970 AM) is a radio station broadcasting a news/talk format. Licensed to Norwich, New York, United States, the station is currently owned by Townsquare Media. WCHN has programming from Fox News Radio, NBC News Radio, Compass Media Networks, Premiere Networks, Radio America, and Westwood One.

References

External links

CHN
Townsquare Media radio stations